The Agbogbloshie market is a trading centre in Agbogbloshie, Accra, Ghana and also one of the busiest market in Ghana

References

Companies based in Accra
Retail markets in Ghana